Jinsafut is a Palestinian village in the Qalqilya Governorate in the northeastern West Bank, located  east of Qalqilya.   According to the Palestinian Central Bureau of Statistics, the village had a population of approximately 2,300 inhabitants in mid-year 2006.

Fatah's Secretary-General Farouk Kaddoumi was born in Jinsafut.

In 2012 it was decided that Jinsafut and Al-Funduq should be merged under one local council.

Location
It is bordered by Immatin  to the east, Deir Istiya  to the south, Wadi Qana (in Salfit Governorate) to the west and Hajja to the north.

History
A construction text, over the lintel to a shrine known both as az-Zawiyah, and al Kihlwah, informs us that it was built by Mubarak Ibn Salih Alusi in the Mamluk era, in the year 791 AH, that is 1389 CE.

Ottoman era
The place appeared in 1596 Ottoman tax registers as Jim Safut, being in the Nahiya of Bani Sa'b of the Liwa of Nablus. It had a population of 26 households, all Muslim. They paid a fixed tax-rate of 33.3% on agricultural products, including wheat barley, summer crops, olives, goats and beehives, and a press for olives or grapes; a total of 8,654 akçe.

In 1838, Robinson noted Jin Safut as a village in Beni Sa'ab district, west of Nablus.

In 1870 Victor Guérin noted it from  Fara'ata, but did not visit it.

In 1882, the PEF's Survey of Western Palestine described the village as "a small village on high ground, with wells to the north, and a few olives."

British Mandate era
In the 1922 census of Palestine conducted by the British Mandate authorities, Jensafut had a population of 267 inhabitants, all Muslims,  increasing in the 1931 census to 315 Muslims, with 76 houses.

In the 1945 census the population was 450 Muslims, with 9,356 dunams of land, according to an official land and population survey. Of this, 1,410  dunams were for plantations or irrigated land, 2,208 for cereals, while 14 dunams were built-up (urban) land.

Jordanian era
In the wake of the 1948 Arab–Israeli War, and after the 1949 Armistice Agreements, Jinsafut came under Jordanian rule. It was annexed by Jordan in 1950.

The Jordanian census of 1961 found 729 inhabitants in Jinsafut.

1967-present
Since the Six-Day War in 1967, Jinsafut has been under Israeli occupation.

After the 1995 accords, 4.8% of Jinsafut and Al-Funduq land was classified as Area B, the remaining 95.2% is Area C.

Israel has expropriated 713 dunums of  land from Jinsafut in order to establish two Israeli settlements; Karne Shomron and Neve Oramin.

Demographics
Some families of Jinsafut include al-Ayoub, al-Sukar, al-Saber, al-Allan, al-Nassar, al-Bashir and Eid. Prior to 1967, Jinsafut had a population of 700, which decreased to 550 after the 1967 Six-Day War; The drop was caused by residents fleeing the village to Jordan. According to a PCBS estimate, the village had grown to 2,122 inhabitants in 2003, then rose to 2,280 in 2006.

Economy
Before 1967, 99.5% of Jinsafut's labor force depended agriculture, particularly on peach and grape crops, as well as raising livestock. The remainder worked in civil jobs. From 1967 to 2002, 91% of the village residents depended on agriculture or working in Israel, 6% were employed in the Palestinian National Authority government and 3% worked in commerce. Since the beginning of the Second Intifada, vehicle movement in Jinsafut has been constricted by Israel, contributing to 93% of the working population being unemployed.

According to the Applied Research Institute - Jerusalem, Jinsafut has a land area of 9,335 dunams; 31.8% is used for growing crops, 4.3% are for heterogeneous agricultural areas, 1.9% for herbaceous vegetation associations, 5.2% is designated as arable land, 3% is built-up area, 8% is used for land for Israeli settlements and the remainder is forest area.

References

Bibliography

External links
 Welcome To Jinsafut
 Jinsafut, Welcome to Palestine
Survey of Western Palestine, Map 11:  IAA, Wikimedia commons 
Jinsafut Village (including Al Funduq Locality) (Fact Sheet),  Applied Research Institute–Jerusalem (ARIJ)
Jinsafut Village Profile (including Al Funduq Locality), ARIJ
Jinsafut, aerial photo, ARIJ
The Segregation Wall hits more Palestinian lands in Qalqilyia district, 15, June, 2004, ARIJ
Tree uprooting and colonial expansion in Jinsafut village,   04, June,  2005, ARIJ
Talk of Churchills and Chamberlains, By Akiva Eldar, Haaretz,  May.16, 2006 
Jinsafut village's land devastated for Wall construction,  15,  January, 2007, ARIJ
Demolition Warnings in Jinsafut Village - Qalqlyiah Governorate,  24, February, 2007, ARIJ
House demolition and warning campaign continued in Qalqiliay governorate, 11, September, 2007, ARIJ
Hundreds of olive trees burned by Israeli settlers in Jinsafut Village, 01, October, 2007, ARIJ
Halt Construction Orders against a number of structures in Hajja and Jinsafut villages, 20, February, 2010, ARIJ
Ravaging 60 trees in Jinsafut village in Qalqiliya 15, January, 2012, ARIJ

Qalqilya Governorate
Villages in the West Bank
Municipalities of the State of Palestine